Nunley may refer to:

People 
 Andre Nunley (born 1974), former American soccer player
  (born 1990), American hurdler
 Charlene R. Nunley (born 1950), first woman to become president of Montgomery College
 Frank Nunley (born 1945), American football player
 Harold Nunley (1912–2005), English cricketer
 Jeremy Nunley (1971–2018), American football player
 Royce Nunley (born 1976), American singer
 Troy L. Nunley (born 1964), American judge in the United States District Court for the Eastern District of California

See also 
 Nunley's, a New York amusement park and a Tennessee furniture store chain